The Milwaukee Bar Association is a 501(c)6 professional non-profit organization created to support legal professionals and to help provide access to justice. The MBA is located in Milwaukee, Wisconsin.

History 
The Milwaukee Bar Association was founded in 1858 with 30 charter members. It is the fifth oldest bar association in the United States. Today the Milwaukee Bar Association has over 2,000 members.

Administration 
Sarah J. Martis, CAE is the Executive Director of the Milwaukee Bar Association.

References

External links 
 

Organizations based in Milwaukee
American municipal bar associations
Organizations established in 1858
Wisconsin law
1858 establishments in Wisconsin